
Year 412 (CDXII) was a leap year starting on Monday (link will display the full calendar) of the Julian calendar. At the time, it was known in Europe as the Year of the Consulship of Honorius and Theodosius (or, less frequently, year 1165 Ab urbe condita). The denomination 412 for this year has been used since the early medieval period, when the Anno Domini calendar era became the prevalent method in Europe for naming years.

Events 
 By place 

 Roman Empire 
 The Visigoths, led by King Ataulf, move into the south of Gaul. He establishes his residence at Narbonne, and makes an alliance with Emperor Honorius, against the usurper Jovinus.
 Emperor Jovinus elevates his brother Sebastianus as co-emperor (Augustus) and takes control of Gaul.
 Heraclianus, governor (Comes Africae), revolts against Honorius and proclaims himself Augustus. He interrupts the grain supply to Rome. Honorius condemns him and his supporters to death with an edict at Ravenna.
 The Theodosian Walls are constructed at Constantinople during the reign of emperor Theodosius II. The work is carried out under supervision of Anthemius, notable praetorian prefect of the East.
 Winter – Olympiodorus, historical writer, is sent on an embassy by Honorius, and sails in stormy weather around Greece up the Black Sea, to meet the Huns who are located on the middle Danube (modern Bulgaria).

 Balkans 
 The forts on the west bank of the Danube, which were destroyed by the Huns, are rebuilt, and a new Danubian fleet is launched.

 By topic 

 Religion 
 An edict of Honorius outlaws Donatism.
 Cyril of Alexandria becomes Patriarch of Alexandria.
 Lazarus, bishop of Aix-en-Provence, and Herod, bishop of Arles, are expelled from their sees on a charge of Manichaeism.
 Fa-Hien, Chinese Buddhist monk, spends 2 years in Ceylon and is more than 200 days at sea as storms drive his ship off its course, but returns with sacred Buddhist texts back to China (see 414).

Births 
 February 8 – Proclus, Greek Neoplatonist philosopher (d. 485)
 Lu Huinan, empress dowager of the Liu Song Dynasty (d. 466)

Deaths 
 October 15 – Theophilus, Patriarch of Alexandria
 Qifu Gangui, prince of the Xianbei state Western Qin
 Sarus, Gothic chieftain
 Uldin, chieftain of the Huns
 Wang Shen'ai, empress of the Jin Dynasty (born 384)

References